Arman Mikaelyan (born 25 November 1996) is an Armenian chess Grandmaster (2017).

In 2011, he became the Vice-champion of the World Youth U16 Chess Olympiad. Arman Mikaelyan won silver medal in Armenian Chess Championship in 2015. In August 2019, he finished third in the Riga Technical University Open "A" tournament. He tied for first place at the World Open in 2022. 

In 2015, Arman Mikaelyan was awarded the FIDE International Master (IM) title and received the FIDE Grandmaster (GM) title two years later.

Achievements 

 Six time Armenian youth medalist (in 2006, 2010, 2011, 2012, 2013, 2014)

 2009: Champion (U-14), Second  (U-16)   "Jermuk-2009" International Open Chess Tournament Under-16 

 2010: Tied for 3rd place at the European Youth Chess Championship 

 2011: Vice-champion of the World Youth U16 Chess Olympiad 

 2014: 3rd place at the 75th Armenian Ch. The 1st League 
 2014: 3rd place at the Armenian Club Championship 
 2015: Vice-champion of the Highest League of  Armenia 

 2016: Bronze medalist of the Nana Aleksandria Cup 
 2017: Bronze medalist of the 2nd Yerevan Open 
 2019: 3rd place in the Riga Technical University Open 
 2019: Third in the 4° International Festival Roma  Città Aperta  
 2021: Tied for 1st place at the 3rd Yerevan Open   
 2022: Winner of the Lone Star Open 
 2022: Third at the 14th Foxwoods Open 
 2022: Tied for 1st place at the World Open 
 2022: Winner of the Pacific Coast Open 
 2022: Winner of the Hollywood Chess GM Norm Classic 
 2022: Winner of the Las Vegas Open  
 2022: Tied for 2nd place at the North American Open  
 2023: Winner of the 1000GM LA GM Norm Invitational 
 2023: Second place at the Western Class

References

External links

Arman Mikaelyan chess games at 365chess.com

1996 births
Sportspeople from Yerevan
Armenian chess players
Chess grandmasters
Living people